Roman Voronko (born 1 April 1978) is a Ukrainian sprinter. He competed in the men's 4 × 400 metres relay at the 2000 Summer Olympics.

References

1978 births
Living people
Athletes (track and field) at the 2000 Summer Olympics
Ukrainian male sprinters
Olympic athletes of Ukraine
Place of birth missing (living people)